Mentzelia crocea, the Sierra blazingstar or saffron blazing star, is an annual wildflower endemic to the Sierra Nevada foothills of California.

The flowering plant can be found up to  elevation.

Description
The stem grows up to a meter tall. The lobed leaves in the basal rosette are up to 20 centimeters long; those farther up the stem are smaller. The flower has 5 shiny yellow petals with orange spots at the bases. The petals may reach 3.6 centimeters in length. At the center are many long, whiskery stamens which may approach 3 centimeters long.

The fruit is a narrow utricle up to 3.5 centimeters long containing many tiny seeds which can be seen to be covered in minute bumps when viewed under magnification.

References

Mentzelia crocea, Jepson Flora Project

External links
 Mentzelia crocea, Calflora
 family: Loasaceae, Calflora

crocea
Endemic flora of California
Flora of the Sierra Nevada (United States)
Taxa named by Albert Kellogg
Flora without expected TNC conservation status